Marcel-Pierre Cléach (16 January 1934 – 18 March 2019) was a French politician, as a member of the Senate of France.  He represented the Sarthe department, and was a member of the Union for a Popular Movement.

References

Page on the Senate website

1934 births
2019 deaths
French Senators of the Fifth Republic
Union for a Popular Movement politicians
Senators of Sarthe